Lars Nussbaumer (born 31 January 2001) is an Austrian professional footballer who plays as a midfielder for FC Dornbirn.

Club career

Early years
Nussbaumer was born in Langenegg, Vorarlberg, Austria and his career with local club FC Langenegg. In 2015, he joined the AKA Vorarlberg regional academy, where he in his first season at under-15 level was the top goalscorer of the league before suffering a broken collarbone in October 2015.

Rheindorf Altach
Ahead of the 2017–18 season, Nussbaumer moved to Rheindorf Altach, where he signed a contract that until June 2020. He would also remain part of the club's youth teams.

In July 2017, he made his debut for the reserve team in the Austrian Regionalliga, where he came on as a substitute for his cousin Daniel Nussbaumer in the 61st minute on the first matchday of that season against VfB Hohenems.

In February 2018, Nussbaumer was included in the first-team squad for the first time for the match against LASK. He made his professional debut in the Austrian Bundesliga on 27 May 2018, when he came off the bench for Patrick Salomon in the 85th minute of matchday 36 against Sturm Graz. 

On 10 August 2020, he joined FC Dornbirn on loan, as part of the two clubs' cooperation agreement. After six appearances in the 2. Liga, he returned to Altach prematurely in November 2020.

FC Dornbirn
On 13 June 2022, Nussbaumer joined FC Dornbirn on a permanent deal, after having already spent six months on loan at the club in 2020.

Personal life
Nussbaumer is the cousin of Daniel Nussbaumer, who is also a professional footballer.

References

2001 births
Living people
Footballers from Vorarlberg
Austrian footballers
Austria youth international footballers
Association football midfielders
SC Rheindorf Altach players
FC Dornbirn 1913 players
Austrian Football Bundesliga players
2. Liga (Austria) players
People from Bregenz District